Richcraft is a 1959 studio big band album by Buddy Rich and a big band / orchestra with arrangements by Ernie Wilkins.  A nearly identical album, titled The Rich Rebellion was released by Wing Records without "I Want a Little Girl" but with two additional tracks from an April, 1960 (Septet) recording session ("That's Rich Man" and "Astronaut").

Track listing

Richcraft
LP Side A
"Indiana (Back Home Again in Indiana)" (Ballard MacDonald, James F. Hanley) – 3:38
"Richcraft" (Ernie Wilkins) – 3:06
"Sweets Tooth" (Ernie Wilkins) – 4:01
"Clap Hands! Here Comes Charley!" (Ballard MacDonald, Joseph Meyer, Billy Rose) – 3:04
"Yardbird Suite" (Charlie Parker) – 2:59
LP Side B
"Cherokee (Indian Love Song)" (Ray Noble) – 4:08
"I Want a Little Girl" (Billy Moll, Murray Mencher) – 4:12
"From the Sticks" (Ernie Wilkins)  – 4:42
"Song of the Islands" (Charles E. King) – 4:09

The Rich Rebellion
LP Side A
"Indiana" ("Back Home Again In Indiana") – 3:38
"That's Rich Man" – 5:26
"Sweets Tooth" – 4:01
"Song Of The Islands" – 4:09
"From The Sticks" – 4:42
LP Side B
"Astronaut" – 7:36
"Richcraft" – 3:06
"Yardbird Suite" – 2:59
"Cherokee" – 4:08
"Clap Hands, Here Comes Charlie" – 3:04

Personnel
Ernie Wilkins – arranger
Buddy Rich – drums, percussion
Phil Woods – alto saxophone
Earle Warren – alto saxophone
Steve Perlow – baritone saxophone
Benny Golson – tenor saxophone
Al Cohn – tenor saxophone
Harry "Sweets" Edison – trumpet
Emmett Berry – trumpet
Joe Ferrante – trumpet
Stan Fishelson – trumpet
Jimmy Nottingham – trumpet
Eddie Bert – trombone
Billy Byers – trombone
Jimmy Cleveland – trombone
Willie Dennis – trombone
John Bunch – piano
Sam Herman – guitar
Phil Leshin – double bass
Septet (only) on "That's Rich Man" and "Astronaut":
Buddy Rich – drums
Irving "Marky" Markowitz – trumpet
Willie Dennis – trombone
Seldon Powell – tenor saxophone
Mike Mainieri – vibraphone
Dave McKenna – piano
Earl May – bass

References

Mercury MG 20451 (mono)
Mercury SR 60136 (stereo)
Wing SRW 16407 (stereo)

Buddy Rich albums
Albums arranged by Ernie Wilkins
Mercury Records albums
1959 albums